Margaret Graham may refer to:

Margaret Graham, Countess of Menteith (1334–1380), Scottish noblewoman
Margaret Nowell Graham (1867–1942), American artist who painted with watercolors
Margaret Bloy Graham (1920–2015), Canadian creator of children's books
Margaret Collier Graham (1850–1910), short story writer in southern California
Margaret Manson Graham (1860–1933), Scottish nurse and missionary in Nigeria
Margaret Graham (broadcaster) (1889–1966), Australian teacher known for the radio program Kindergarten of the Air
Margaret Graham (balloonist) (1800s–1880s), first British woman to make a solo balloon flight
Margaret Graham (Matron) (1860–1942), South Australian nurse served in Egypt during WWI

See also
Mary Margaret Graham, US Deputy Director of National Intelligence for Collection (2005–2008)